Moonshake were a British-based experimental rock/post-rock band, existing between 1991 and 1997. The only consistent member was singer/sampler player/occasional guitarist David Callahan, who initially co-led the project with Margaret Fiedler (Fiedler and bass player John Frenett would leave Moonshake in 1993 to form the more commercially successful Laika). The band was notable for its extensive use of textures and sampler technology in a rock context.

History

Formation (1991)
David Callahan (vocals, guitars, samplers) had been in indie rock band The Wolfhounds, who were active for much of the second half of the 1980s. Often associated with the C86 indie scene of the time, the band released several acclaimed albums of abrasive guitar pop and a dozen or so singles on a variety of labels. Following the dissolution of The Wolfhounds, Callahan decided to form a new band and recruited Margaret Fiedler (vocals, guitars, samplers), John Frenett (bass) and finally Miguel "Mig" Moreland (drums, percussion). Although Callahan originally favoured Skyscraper as a project name, the band ultimately settled on the name Moonshake (taken from a Can single on the seminal Krautrockers' Future Days album). 

Callahan and Fiedler alternated the lead vocal and songwriting duties for the band, both favouring very different approaches: Fiedler created surreal, ethereal and atmospheric material, while Callahan favoured harsher-sounding urban narratives. Due to this factor, the performance style of the band alternated considerably depending on which songwriter's songs were being played. Initially, the band's diversity added to its strength - in 2009, Fiedler would recall "I really liked Dave Callahan's songs and his voice - obviously! That's why I wanted to be in a band with him... We were different people and wrote differently, but came from the same influences - Can, PIL, Kraftwerk, Eric B & Rakim, and MBV to name a few bands. Moonshake was a collision - it was supposed to be a collision." Regardless of the divergence in approaches, all Moonshake songs made a strong use of textures, noise and sampler technology.

First lineup - early EPs and Eva Luna (1991–1992)
Moonshake signed to Alan McGee's Creation Records for their debut EP, First, released in spring 1991. At this point, the band was continuing to follow the harsh-effected guitar-heavy sound which had characterised a lot of the last Wolfhounds recordings. The results drew comparisons with Sonic Youth and especially My Bloody Valentine, and lacked the dub element which would feature in later recordings.  

After the release of First, Moonshake signed to the emerging independent label Too Pure (home of PJ Harvey, Th' Faith Healers and Stereolab). Their first single for the new label was Secondhand Clothes, which showed a leaning towards the dub-bass-heavy post-punk sound of bands such as Public Image Limited and The Pop Group. This was followed in 1992 by the Beautiful Pigeon EP (which featured two rare songwriting collaborations between Callahan and Fiedler) and then by Moonshake's debut album, Eva Luna. The band began to earn many positive reviews for its unusual sample-driven and rhythmically propulsive sound, which drew on indie rock, noise-rock, breakbeats, electronica, psychedelia, dub, art-rock, Krautrock and punk.

Big Good Angel and split of original lineup (1993)
For 1993's mini-album Big Good Angel, both Callahan and Fiedler contributed three songs each. By now the divergent styles of the two songwriters was producing too much creative tension for the band to survive for much longer. In 2009, Fiedler recalled that "maybe after a while, the tension that was there in our writing and singing styles spilled over into real life. Things did get extremely tense on the last tour we did together in 1993 in North America."

Following this tour, Moonshake split in half, with Margaret Fiedler and John Frenett departing to form Laika with Guy Fixsen (who had engineered Eva Luna). In 2009 Fiedler would recall of the split "it wasn't amicable. In fact it took me years to get over it, which is kinda sad to admit. I haven't spoken to Dave in years..." Earlier (in a 1995 Laika interview), she commented "Laika is a close working collective; in Moonshake that was never possible. David and I always did what we liked. I have never compromised myself and that's the main reason why I was forced to leave the band. After the American tour David no longer wanted to work with me."

Second lineup and The Sound Your Eyes Can Follow (1994–1995)
Moonshake was left as a duo of David Callahan and Mig Moreland. With the loss of Fiedler's guitar-playing and with Callahan's increasing interest in samplers, the band began moving further away from indie rock and psychedelia and deeper into Callahan's art-punk/film-noir stylings. While recording the band's second full-length album, The Sound Your Eyes Can Follow, Callahan and Moreland drew on a host of guest musicians. Collapsed Lung's bass player Johnny Dawe covered for the departed Frenett, while PJ Harvey, Stereolab keyboard player Katharine Gifford and Sidi Bou Said members Lee Howton and Claire Lemmon all contributed vocals. Horns were added by trumpeter Andrew Blick (Blowpipe) and saxophonist Raymond Dickaty (from Gallon Drunk and Skree). The band refused to use an outside producer for the sessions and self-produced instead, labelling producers as "an overpaid imposition".

The Sound Your Eyes Can Follow was released in 1994 (a few months before Fiedler, Frenett and Fixsen followed with their debut as Laika). It revealed that Moonshake had completely banned guitars from their new sound, relying entirely on the combination of Dickaty's saxophones with looped and layered samples over the rhythm section (in a similar manner to The Young Gods). Compared to earlier recordings, the new Moonshake material was jazzier (with extensive horn parts) and more direct. Callahan wrote all of the songs for the record, with his bleak, vivid urban vision now uninterrupted and untempered by Fiedler's more psychedelic approaches. However, the use of female singers on the record – in particular, PJ Harvey's striking guest contribution on "Just a Working Girl" – would ensure that for now Moonshake would retain a strong female component despite Fiedler's departure. 

During the recording of The Sound Your Eyes Can Follow, Dickaty had joined the band as a full-time member and Matt Brewer was recruited as the new bass guitarist. When Moreland then left the band to join Moose, Callahan was left as the sole surviving original member. Moreland was replaced on drums by Kevin Bass. Katherine Gifford continued to guest as female harmony singer on live Moonshake dates (as well as performing as lead singer on those newer songs written for a female voice, such as "Heart Keeps Beating"). 

The Sound Your Eyes Can Follow received good reviews not matched by great sales, and some time after the release of the album Moonshake would part company with Too Pure.

The C/Z years - Dirty & Divine and final split (1996–1997)
In 1996, Moonshake signed with the Seattle indie label C/Z Records, which was determined to promote them in America. As part of this, the band joined the 1996 Lollapalooza tour of the American Midwest headlined by Metallica and Wu-Tang Clan. The latter experience proved disappointing - assigned to "the third stage", the band found themselves playing from the back of a truck some distance from the main arena. Dickaty would later recall "with other so-called 'alternative' artists, we played to a largely indifferent crowd of thrill-seeking metal fans." and the band were unimpressed by their treatment by the Lollapalooza organisation.

Katherine Gifford left altogether in 1996 (to form Snowpony), where she was later joined by Kevin Bass. Moonshake then recruited Michael Rother (not to be confused with his namesake in Neu!) as the new drummer. This line-up recorded the band's final album Dirty & Divine. Compared to The Sound Your Eyes Can Follow, Dirty & Divine featured a far less prominent role for female vocals (reduced more to harmonies) and reduced instrumentation, being recorded by a core group of Callahan, Brewer, Rother and Dickaty (with vocal assistance from Stereolab's Mary Hansen). The album contained various songs which had been played in the Moonshake set during the previous two years, with subjects ranging from sailor's tales, the lives and deaths of cities, addictions to risk and danger and sexual fantasy in advertising. 

Dirty & Divine was released in 1996 on C/Z Records and later licensed to a UK release through World Domination Recordings By this time, however, three years of self-management and hard touring with little reward had exhausted the band. In 1997, shortly after the UK release of Dirty & Divine, Callahan moved to the USA (to briefly relocate to Brooklyn, New York City) and the band split up, albeit amicably.

Post-Moonshake
An EP of Moonshake remixes – originally commissioned to promote the Dirty & Divine album – was belatedly issued in 1999, though this release was disowned by Callahan.

David Callahan's time in the United States was brief, and he returned to London soon afterwards. He re-emerged on the London music scene in the early 2000s, setting up a multimedia/DJ/music project called The $urplus!. In its band formation (in which Callahan was joined by singer Anja Buechele) The $urplus! released a single self-titled EP containing four songs, resembling Moonshake's later material but with a lighter and less brutal approach, the inclusion of guitars, and Callahan and Buechele operating as much more equal partners than was the case with latter-day Moonshake. The band briefly experimented with an expanded garage-rock lineup, but did not release any more material (although Buechele would later contribute to the revived Bark Psychosis). Post-$urplus, Callahan involved himself in other work including DJing. Callahan would also reform The Wolfhounds (initially for live performances in 2004 and 2006, but with a full and ongoing reunion following in 2010).

Raymond Dickaty would go on to join Spiritualized and would stay with them until 2002, following which he studied free improvisation. He would later work with The Duke Spirit, AMP, Zukanican and his own free-jazz/rock fusion band Solar Fire Trio. In 2006 he joined the Ninja Tune band Loka. Relocating to Poland in 2009, he would become a member of both the Trifonidis Free Orchestra and the Tricphonix Streetband.

In early 2019, Callahan began hinting in Facebook posts that he was working on new Moonshake material (although he provided no details on collaborators or a proposed release date) alongside his ongoing Wolfhounds work and a new parallel solo acoustic career as David Lance Callahan. He also began work on a new blog called 'On the Rock'n'Roll' dealing with "a history of making music on the dole, incorporating anecdotes, interviews, musical selections, social history, dirty squatters, social security scroungers, workshy ponces and a whole load of cultural misappropriation", for which the first entry related to Moonshake performing a 1997 record label showcase in New Orleans while Callahan and Michael Rother were simultaneously waiting for imminent DSS Restart interviews back in the UK.

Connections
During his Moonshake years, David Callahan enjoyed brief cameos with contemporaries (and originally, Too Pure labelmates) Stereolab, performing "French Disko" with them on Channel 4's The Word in 1993, and the Stereolab spin-off project Turn On. Ray Dickaty also played with Stereolab, appearing on several tracks recorded around the time of their Emperor Tomato Ketchup album. The connection also went the other way: Stereolab's Mary Hansen and Katherine Gifford provided backing vocals on Moonshake's last album Dirty and Divine. Some copies of Dirty and Divine were even stickered to alert potential buyers to Hansen's presence.

Discography

Singles
First EP (1991, Creation Records)
Secondhand Clothes EP (1991, Too Pure)
"Beautiful Pigeon" (1992, Too Pure)
"Lola Lola" b/w "Always True to You in My Fashion" (1995, Clawfist Singles Club)
"Cranes" (1996, C/Z / World Domination)

Albums
Eva Luna (1992, Too Pure / 1993, Matador / Atlantic)
Big Good Angel (Mini-album) (1993, Too Pure / Matador)
The Sound Your Eyes Can Follow (1994, Too Pure / American)
Dirty & Divine (1996, C/Z-BMG / World Domination)
Remixes (1999, C/Z)

Compilation appearances
Beautiful Pigeon (1992, V/A "Independent Top 20 Volume 15", Beechwood Music; the track "Night Tripper" also appeared on a 7" single given away with the vinyl edition of this LP)
Just a Working Girl (1994, V/A "Pop - Do We Not Like That?", Too Pure)
Nothing but Time (1995, V/A "Volume 16 - Copulation Explosion")

References

External links
  Access through the Wolfhounds website

Creation Records artists
British indie rock groups
British experimental rock groups
British post-rock groups
Musical groups established in 1991
Musical groups disestablished in 1997
Musical groups from London